Rubén Alvarez (30 May 1961 – 9 November 2014) was an Argentine professional golfer.

Alvarez was born in Pilar, Buenos Aires. He worked as a caddie in Buenos Aires, before turning professional in 1986.

Alvarez won the Argentine Qualifying School in 1986, and went on to win the Argentine Tour Ranking (Order of Merit) in 1991, but he only competed once in a major championships, the British Open in 1994. He competed on the Challenge Tour in 1991, with a best of two second-place finishes, the Ramlösa Open and the Jede Hot Cup, both held in Sweden. He competed on the European Tour from 1993 to 1995, and had two top ten finishes, coming 9th in both the 1994 Tenerife Open and the 1995 Madeira Island Open.

Alvarez represented Argentina on two occasions in the World Cup, 1991 in Rome, Italy and 1992 in Madrid, Spain. He was second in the San Pablo Open (Brazil) in 1990.

Alvarez died of cancer in 2014.

Professional wins

Argentine wins (18)
1991 Pinamar Open, South Open, Acantilados Grand Prix, Norpatagonico Open, Praderas Grand Prix
1992 Boulonge Four Ball, La Orquidea Grand Prix, Hindu Club Grand Prix, Martindale Grand Prix, Los Pinguinos Grand Prix
1993 Praderas Grand Prix
1995 Argentine PGA Championship, Norpatagonico Open
1998 Parana Open
1999 Praderas Grand Prix
2000 Metropolitano Open
2003 South Open
2004 Smithfield Club Grand Prix

Other wins (1)
1991 La Deheza Grand Prix (Chile)

Team appearances
World Cup (representing Argentina): 1991, 1992

References

External links

Argentine male golfers
European Tour golfers
Sportspeople from Buenos Aires Province
1961 births
2014 deaths